Delta Epsilon Chi may refer to:

the former name of DECA's college division
an honor society sponsored by the Association for Biblical Higher Education